Faristenia nakatanii is a moth in the family Gelechiidae. It is found in Japan (Kyushu, Ryukyus).

The larvae feed on Distylium racemosum.

References

Faristenia
Moths described in 2012